Sue Barker defeated Renáta Tomanová in the final, 6–2, 0–6, 6–2 to win the women's singles tennis title at the 1976 French Open.

Chris Evert was the two-time reigning champion, but chose not to defend her title. She elected to compete in World TeamTennis and did not return to the French Open until 1979.

Seeds
The seeded players are listed below. Sue Barker is the champion; others show the round in which they were eliminated.

 Sue Barker (champion)
 Helga Masthoff (quarterfinals)
 Marita Redondo (third round)
 Mima Jaušovec (second round)
 Lesley Hunt (first round)
 Linky Boshoff (second round)
 Gail Chanfreau Lovera (second round)
 Fiorella Bonicelli (second round)

Draw

Key
 Q = Qualifier
 WC = Wild card
 LL = Lucky loser
 r = Retired

Finals

Earlier rounds

Section 1

Section 2

Section 3

Section 4

References

External links
1976 French Open – Women's draws and results at the International Tennis Federation

Women's Singles
French Open by year – Women's singles
French Open - Women's Singles
1976 in women's tennis
1976 in French women's sport